The Cyprus whip snake (Hierophis cypriensis) is a species of snake in the family Colubridae.
It is endemic to Cyprus.

Its natural habitats are temperate forests, Mediterranean-type shrubby vegetation, freshwater marshes, intermittent freshwater marshes, and water storage areas. It is one of the three species of the genus Hierophis. No subspecies are currently recognized. It is threatened by habitat loss.

Sources

Hierophis
Endemic fauna of Cyprus
Reptiles of Cyprus
Reptiles described in 1985
Taxonomy articles created by Polbot